The World Bowls Championship is the premier world bowls competition between national bowls organisations. The premier indoor event is the World Indoor Bowls Championships listed separately and is organised by the World Bowls Tour.

World Outdoor Championships
First held in Australia in 1966, the World Outdoor Bowls Championships for men and women are held every four years. From 2008 the men's and women's events were held together. Qualifying national bowls organisations (usually countries) are represented by a team of five players, who play once as a single and a four, then again as a pair and a triple. Gold, silver, and bronze medals are awarded in each of the four disciplines, and there is also a trophy for the best overall team — the Leonard Trophy for men and the Taylor Trophy for women. Northern Ireland & the Republic of Ireland compete as one combined Irish team.

The 2020 event was postponed twice and scheduled for 2021 due to the COVID-19 pandemic. However following continual issues surrounding the pandemic the Championships were officially cancelled on 9 March 2021. Furthermore, it was decided that the World Championships would take place every two years starting in 2023. This also resulted in the fact that qualifying events for the Championships were no longer required meaning the Atlantic Bowls Championships and Asia Pacific Championships were terminated.

Men's Titles

* Jim Candelet was taken ill during the pool stages and had to withdraw from the championships. As the USA did not have an available substitute the organisers allowed George Adrain, a reserve with the Scottish team, to take his place for the rest of the tournament.

Women's Titles

* Irene Molyneux played in the 1981 Fours & Pairs as an injury replacement helping England to the Fours Gold medal.

Summary

See also
 World Bowls Events

References

External links
World Bowls events
World Bowls titles and medallists

Bowls
Recurring sporting events established in 1966